Serena and Venus Williams defeated Andrea Hlaváčková and Lucie Hradecká in the final, 7–5, 6–4 to win the ladies' doubles tennis title at the 2012 Wimbledon Championships. It was the Williams sisters' fifth Wimbledon title together, and their 13th major doubles title together overall.

Květa Peschke and Katarina Srebotnik were the defending champions, but lost in the second round to Francesca Schiavone and Flavia Pennetta.

Seeds

  Liezel Huber /  Lisa Raymond (semifinals)
  Sara Errani /  Roberta Vinci (quarterfinals)
  Květa Peschke /  Katarina Srebotnik (second round)
  Maria Kirilenko /  Nadia Petrova (second round)
  Ekaterina Makarova /  Elena Vesnina (quarterfinals)
  Andrea Hlaváčková /  Lucie Hradecká (final)
  Yaroslava Shvedova /  Galina Voskoboeva (third round)
  Iveta Benešová /  Barbora Záhlavová-Strýcová (second round)
  Nuria Llagostera Vives /  María José Martínez Sánchez (quarterfinals)
  Raquel Kops-Jones /  Abigail Spears (quarterfinals)
  Natalie Grandin /  Vladimíra Uhlířová (third round)
  Anabel Medina Garrigues /  Arantxa Parra Santonja (first round)
  Bethanie Mattek-Sands /  Sania Mirza (third round)
  Gisela Dulko /  Paola Suárez (first round)
  Irina-Camelia Begu /  Monica Niculescu (second round, retired)
  Chuang Chia-jung /  Vera Dushevina (first round)

Qualifying

Draw

Finals

Top half

Section 1

Section 2

Bottom half

Section 3

Section 4

References

External links

2012 Wimbledon Championships on WTAtennis.com
2012 Wimbledon Championships – Women's draws and results at the International Tennis Federation

Women's Doubles
Wimbledon Championship by year – Women's doubles
Wimbledon Championships
Wimbledon Championships